The 1985 Trans America Athletic Conference men's basketball tournament (now known as the ASUN men's basketball tournament) was held March 2–4 at Hanner Fieldhouse in Statesboro, Georgia.

Mercer defeated  in the championship game, 105–96, to win their second TAAC/Atlantic Sun men's basketball tournament. The Bears, therefore, received an automatic bid to the 1985 NCAA tournament.

Nicholls State and Northwestern State departed the TAAC for the Southland Conference prior to the season, keeping the total membership of the conference at eight. In turn, this was Georgia State's first TAAC tournament.

Bracket

References

ASUN men's basketball tournament
Tournament
TAAC men's basketball tournament
TAAC men's basketball tournament